In eight-dimensional geometry, a rectified 8-simplex is a convex uniform 8-polytope, being a rectification of the regular 8-simplex.

There are unique 3 degrees of rectifications in regular 8-polytopes. Vertices of the rectified 8-simplex are located at the edge-centers of the 8-simplex. Vertices of the birectified 8-simplex are located in the triangular face centers of the 8-simplex. Vertices of the trirectified 8-simplex are located in the tetrahedral cell centers of the 8-simplex.

Rectified 8-simplex 

Coordinates 

The Cartesian coordinates of the vertices of the rectified 8-simplex can be most simply positioned in 9-space as permutations of (0,0,0,0,0,0,0,1,1). This construction is based on facets of the rectified 9-orthoplex.

Images

Birectified 8-simplex 

The birectified 8-simplex is the vertex figure of the 152 honeycomb.

Coordinates 
The Cartesian coordinates of the vertices of the birectified 8-simplex can be most simply positioned in 9-space as permutations of (0,0,0,0,0,0,1,1,1). This construction is based on facets of the birectified 9-orthoplex.

Images

Trirectified 8-simplex 

Coordinates 
The Cartesian coordinates of the vertices of the trirectified 8-simplex can be most simply positioned in 9-space as permutations of (0,0,0,0,0,1,1,1,1). This construction is based on facets of the trirectified 9-orthoplex.

Images

Related polytopes 

This polytope is the vertex figure of the 9-demicube, and the edge figure of the uniform 261 honeycomb.

It is also one of 135 uniform 8-polytopes with A8 symmetry.

Notes

References
 H.S.M. Coxeter: 
 H.S.M. Coxeter, Regular Polytopes, 3rd Edition, Dover New York, 1973 
 Kaleidoscopes: Selected Writings of H.S.M. Coxeter, edited by F. Arthur Sherk, Peter McMullen, Anthony C. Thompson, Asia Ivic Weiss, Wiley-Interscience Publication, 1995,  
 (Paper 22) H.S.M. Coxeter, Regular and Semi Regular Polytopes I, [Math. Zeit. 46 (1940) 380-407, MR 2,10]
 (Paper 23) H.S.M. Coxeter, Regular and Semi-Regular Polytopes II, [Math. Zeit. 188 (1985) 559-591]
 (Paper 24) H.S.M. Coxeter, Regular and Semi-Regular Polytopes III, [Math. Zeit. 200 (1988) 3-45]
 Norman Johnson Uniform Polytopes, Manuscript (1991)
 N.W. Johnson: The Theory of Uniform Polytopes and Honeycombs, Ph.D. 
  o3x3o3o3o3o3o3o - rene, o3o3x3o3o3o3o3o - brene, o3o3o3x3o3o3o3o - trene

External links 
 Polytopes of Various Dimensions
 Multi-dimensional Glossary

8-polytopes